Iluileq (named 'Ilivilik' in old maps) is an uninhabited island in the Kujalleq municipality in southern Greenland.

History
Wilhelm August Graah (1793–1863) met groups of Southeast-Greenland Inuit on the island during his 1828–30 expedition. He was impressed by some of the women, finding them more beautiful and cleaner compared with the West Greenlandic women he had known.

In June 1870 Iluileq was the place where the crew of the Hansa, the supply ship of the Second German North Polar Expedition was finally able to land after their ship became separated from the Germania, drifted with the ice pack and sank. The crew drifted on the sea ice southward and after nearly eleven months finally reached Iluileq by boat. They found no Inuit on the island. From there they followed the shore southwards until they reached the Moravian Herrnhut mission at Friedrichsthal (modern Narsaq Kujalleq) near Cape Farewell, from where they got back to Germany on a Danish ship.

Geography
Iluileq is a coastal island that lies off King Frederick VI Coast in southeastern Greenland. It is located at the head of Iluileq Fjord (Danell Fjord), on the northern side of it. A small narrow fjord branch or sound separates Iluileq from the mainland on its NW side and Kangerluk Fjord opens its mouth just north of the eastern end of the sound.

Iluileq has rugged cliffs, its highest point reaching . Off the eastern end of the island's coast lies Cape Discord (Kangeq) and off its southern shore lies the small cluster of islets named Ivingmiut.

See also
List of islands of Greenland

References

External links
 Den grønlandske Lods - Geodatastyrelsen 

Uninhabited islands of Greenland
Kujalleq